Walter Frederick Light,  (June 24, 1923 – February 24, 1996) was a Canadian business executive.

Born in Cobalt, Ontario, Light served in the Royal Canadian Air Force during World War II. After the war, he received a degree in electrical engineering from Queen's University in 1949. He started working for Bell Canada eventually being promoted to the head of the engineering department.

In 1974, he became president of Northern Telecom. In 1979, he became president and chief executive officer. He retired in 1984.

Honours
In 1980, he received an honorary doctorate from Concordia University. In 1986, he was made an Officer of the Order of Canada in recognition for bringing Northern Telecom "to the forefront of international technology as a major Canadian multinational". In 1988, he was made a Member of the Order of Ontario. Queen's University's Walter Light Hall is named in his honour.

References

1923 births
1996 deaths
Members of the Order of Ontario
Nortel employees
Officers of the Order of Canada
People from Cobalt, Ontario
Queen's University at Kingston alumni
Canadian chief executives